

Duchess of Galliera

First Creation
None

Second Creation

Third Creation

Notes

 
French princesses
House of Orléans-Galliera
Galliera